Ostrovul Ciocănești (Romanian) or Остров Ветрен (Bulgarian) is an island in the Danube four miles south of Ciocănești, Călărași County, Romania. It is the subject of a territorial dispute between Bulgaria and Romania.

References 

Geography of Călărași County
Islands of the Danube
Disputed islands